Giannis Michailidis (born 18 February 2000) is a Greek professional footballer who plays as a centre-back for Super League club PAOK and the Greece national team.

Club career

PAOK
Born on February 18, 2000, he became a member of the Giannitsa Sports Academy, moving through all the age level groups until he was 16, when he joined PAOK. Relatively “old” for the PAOK Academy at that stage, he showed impressively good prospects for PAOK not to try and «exploit» them. From Giannitsa to Thessaloniki then, and from his family home to PAOK Academy house. The transition was di	cult at rst, as he admitted, mainly due to the intensive training and attending school at the same time. However, this did not a ect his performance on the pitch at all.
Up until that point Michailidis played as a defensive mid elder, but he immediately made his presence felt in the defensive line of the Under-17s. A stopper with impressive physical characteristics, being tall and strong, he is also nimble, smart, and fast. A left-footer, Michailidis is also talented with the ball at his feet, standing out for his accurate long passes and the maturity he shows in his game.
With full seasons, rst for the Under-17s and then for the Under-19s, he celebrated three consecutive league championships (seasons 2017–18, 2018–19, and 2019–20), and was part of a group of players who went an astonishing series of 70 games without defeat, while he also played in the UEFA Youth League. Having represented Greece at youth level, he was also called up to the full Greece senior squad in August 2020 for the UEFA Nations League matches. With full seasons with PAOK, first in U-17 and then in U-19, he celebrated with his teammates three consecutive championships and an incredible series of 70 games without defeat, while he also wore the team jersey at UEFA Youth League.

In March 2019, he was promoted to the first team of PAOK and start playing in the last matches of the 2019–20 playoffs, while he scored his first goal against OFI on 4 July 2020 in an away draw 2–2.

In March 2022 Michailidis left the match between PAOK and PAS Giannina injured and the examinations he submitted confirmed the fears of the people of Dikefalos, as the results showed that he suffered a total rupture of the anterior cruciate ligament, a rupture through the meniscus and a second-degree ligament injury.
Giannis Michailidis traveled on Sunday (3/4) in the morning to Portugal where on Monday (4/4) he will undergo the necessary surgery to overcome his serious knee injury. The young defender of Dikefalos will do there the first stage of his recovery and is expected to return to Greece.

International career
As a result of his performance he was a member of both Greece U-17 and Greece U-19 and was also called up to the Greece in August 2020 for the upcoming UEFA Nations League game. He made his national team debut on 7 October 2020 in a friendly against Austria.

Career statistics

Club

Honours

Club
PAOK 
Greek Cup: 2020–21 ;Runner-Up :2021–22

References

2000 births
Living people
Greek footballers
Greece youth international footballers
Greece international footballers
Super League Greece players
PAOK FC players
Association football defenders
Footballers from Giannitsa